Krasnoyarovo (Qıźılyar) is a rural locality (a village) in Sakhayevsky Selsoviet, Karmaskalinsky District, Bashkortostan, Russia. The population was 21 as of 2010. There are two streets.

Geography 
Krasnoyarovo is located 29 km east of Karmaskaly (the district's administrative centre) by road. Syskanovo is the nearest rural locality.

References 

Rural localities in Karmaskalinsky District